Medway (real name Jesse Skeens) is an American DJ and record producer, who has released records on such record labels as Hooj Choons and Release Records. He has also had various tracks on many compilation albums in the Global Underground series. In April 2000, his "Fat Bastard (EP)" spent one week at #69 in the UK Singles Chart. In March 2001, his song, "Release", peaked at #67 in the same listing.

As of 2009, he resides in London, and operates an audio mastering and mixing studio.

References

External links

Medway Studios: Online Mastering

American DJs
American record producers
Year of birth missing (living people)
Living people